Ray is the seventh studio album by Japanese band Bump of Chicken, released through Toy's Factory on March 12, 2014. It debuted atop the Oricon Albums Chart, selling 182,003 copies in its first week. 

"Niji wo Matsu Hito" was used as the main theme to the film Gatchaman, "Zero" was used as the main theme for Final Fantasy Type-0, "Tomodachi no Uta" was used as the ending theme for Doraemon: Nobita and the New Steel Troops—Winged Angels, and "Good Luck" was used as the main theme for Always: Sunset on Third Street '64.

Track listing

Charts

References

2014 albums
Bump of Chicken albums
Japanese-language albums